Ectemnius continuus is a species of square-headed wasp in the family Crabronidae. It is found in Africa, Europe and Northern Asia (excluding China), North America, and Southern Asia.

Subspecies
These four subspecies belong to the species Ectemnius continuus:
 Ectemnius continuus continuus (Fabricius, 1804)
 Ectemnius continuus punctatus (Lepeletier de Saint Fargeau & Brullé, 1835)
 Ectemnius continuus rufitarsis (Dalla Torre, 1897)
 Ectemnius continuus sulphureipes (F. Smith, 1856)

References

External links

 

Crabronidae
Articles created by Qbugbot
Insects described in 1804